Edward John Driffill is a professor of economics at Yale-NUS College, specialising in international macroeconomics and labour economics. With Lars Calmfors, he is the creator of the Calmfors–Driffill hypothesis.

Driffill received his MA from Cambridge University and his PhD from Princeton University. From 1976 to 1989 he lectured at Southampton University. Appointed professor at Queen Mary and Westfield College in 1990, he returned to Southampton University as Professor in 1992, and became professor at Birkbeck in 1999. He is currently a visiting economics professor, acting as the head of studies of Politics, Philosophy, and Economics (PPE) at Yale-NUS College in Singapore.

He is ranked top 5% author on the website IDEAS on several definitions of citations, and the Wu index.

Works
Costs of inflation, 1988
The term structure of interest rates : structural stability and macroeconomic policy changes in the UK, 1990
Real interest rates, nominal shocks, and real shocks, 1997
No credit for transition : the Maastricht treaty and German unemployment, 1998
Product market integration and wages : evidence from a cross-section of manufacturing establishments in the United Kingdom, 1998
Delegation of monetary policy : more than a relocation of the time-inconsistency problem, 2003
Monetary policy and lexicographic preference ordering, 2004

References

English economists
Academics of Birkbeck, University of London
Academics of Queen Mary University of London
Year of birth missing (living people)
Living people